Alsodes pehuenche (common name: Pehuenche spiny-chest frog) is a species of frog in the family Alsodidae. It is endemic to Pehuenche Valley in the Andes of southern Mendoza Province, Argentina, and the adjacent Chile. At the time of the assessment by the International Union for Conservation of Nature (IUCN) in 2012 (published 2013), the species was known from six streams (five in Argentina and one in Chile) in an area encompassing some 9 km². A study published in 2013 extended the known range a few kilometers west and included another Chilean stream.

Habitat
Alsodes pehuenche is an aquatic frog. It is found primarily in galleries inside small permanent snowmelt streams with stony banks, covered by herbaceous vegetation; it can also be found in ponds and swamps derived from snowmelt. The altitude of its habitat is between  asl.

Description
Males in two Chilean locations measured on average  and females  in snout–vent length. The body is bulky and extremities are robust. The head is wide with snout that is short and rounded. The dorsal coloration is light brown with diffuse, irregular, darker blotches. There are sometimes dispersed yellowish blotches that are more frequent in females.

Life cycle
This frog has very slow development: time to metamorphosis is estimated to be at least four winters.

Conservation status
The streams A. pehuenche inhabits are impacted by paving the highway in their catchment. This has already impacted the hydrology and it may affect water quality, particularly because of salting of the highway in winter. Additional threats are waste from tourists and tramping by livestock. Considering these threats and the very limited area of occurrence, the Amphibian Specialist Group of the International Union for Conservation of Nature (IUCN) has classified this species as "Critically Endangered".

References

pehuenche
Amphibians of the Andes
Amphibians of Argentina
Amphibians of Chile
Amphibians described in 1976
Taxa named by José Miguel Alfredo María Cei
Taxonomy articles created by Polbot